Franklin Obed Siakor (born December 3, 1967), served as Junior Senator for Bong County, from 2005 to 2011. He was a member of the Senate's Committee on Planning and Economic Affairs.

Life
Franklin Siakor was born in Gbarnga, Bong County, and is a former pupil and teacher at St Martin's High School, Gbarnga.

Siakor holds an MA in Development Studies, a certificate in Conflict Transformation, a Teacher's certificate and is a former student of the Cuttington University College extension program.

External links
 Siakor interviewed on Raidió Teilifís Éireann

References

1967 births
Living people
Members of the Senate of Liberia
People from Bong County
Cuttington University alumni
21st-century Liberian politicians